was a woodblock print artist, born in Hakodate on the island of Hokkaidō, Japan. 

In 1923 Maeda met Hiratsuka Un'ichi, a leader of the sosaku-hanga "creative prints" movement.  In 1925 he relocated to Tokyo and joined the Kawabata Painting School. He studied Western-style painting (Yōga) with Umehara Ryuzauro and started work in oils. He learned woodblock techniques via his association with the Yoyogi Group of print artists who met at Hiratsuka's house in the 1930s, and by 1940 Maeda was solely working as a printmaker. 

Maeda joined the Ichimoku-kai1 (First Thursday Society), a sosaku-hanga group led by Onchi Koshiro.  He contributed to One Hundred New Views of Japan in 1940, "the two Kitsutsuki Hanga-shu collections (1942-3) and nos 3-6 of the Ichimokushu collections (1947-50), as well as Tokyo Kaiko Zue (Scenes of Lost Tokyo) (1945) and Nihon Minzoku Zufu (1946)."  

Maeda was mentioned and quoted in Oliver Statler's 1956 book Modern Japanese Woodblock Prints: An Art Reborn.

Lawrence Smith's Modern Japanese Prints 1912-1989 describes him as "A typical sosaku hanga group artist in many ways, Maeda nevertheless showed untypically the influence of Nihonga native-style painting.  He also produced fine mountain scenes a little in the vein of Umetaro Azechi."

References
 Smith, Lawrence. Modern Japanese Prints 1912-1989, British Museum Press, 1994, p. 29
 Statler, Oliver. Modern Japanese Woodblock Prints: An Art Reborn, 1956

External links
 Maeda Masao (1904-1974) The Lavenberg Collection of Japanese Prints
 Artelino
 Huge Collection

1904 births
1974 deaths
Japanese printmakers
People from Hakodate
Sosaku hanga artists